Kyron Johnson (born July 24, 1999) is an American football outside linebacker for the Philadelphia Eagles of the National Football League (NFL). He played college football at Kansas and was drafted by the Eagles in the sixth round of the 2022 NFL Draft.

High school
Johnson attended high school at Lamar High School in Arlington, Texas. In a game against North Crowley his senior year, he was taken off the field in a stretcher. Johnson received offers from Kansas and SMU. He committed to Kansas on June 2, 2016.

College career
In Johnson's freshman year, he primarily played special teams, recording 17 tackles playing in 8 of the Jayhawks' games. As a sophomore, he became a starter and made his career start against Nicholls. Following the COVID-19 pandemic shortened 2020 season, Johnson decided to come back for a 5th season due to the NCAA granting an extra year of eligibility for athletes because of the pandemic. He was named 2nd team All-Big 12 his super-senior year in 2021.

Professional career

Johnson was drafted by the Philadelphia Eagles in the sixth round (181st overall) of the 2022 NFL Draft.

References

External links
 Philadelphia Eagles bio
 Kansas Jayhawks bio

1998 births
Kansas Jayhawks football players
American football defensive ends
Sportspeople from Arlington, Texas
Players of American football from Texas
Philadelphia Eagles players
American football linebackers
Living people